Scrobipalpa abai is a moth in the family Gelechiidae. It was described by Povolný in 1977. It is found in Afghanistan.

The forewings are dirty whitish with irregularly scattered grey-tipped scales. The hindwings are dirty whitish.

References

Scrobipalpa
Moths described in 1977